Evelyn Pierrepont, 2nd Duke of Kingston-upon-Hull, KG (171123 September 1773) was an English nobleman and landowner, a member of the House of Lords. He was the only son of William Pierrepont, Earl of Kingston-upon-Hull (1692–1713) and his wife, Rachel Bayntun (1695–1722).

His paternal grandparents were Evelyn Pierrepont, 1st Duke of Kingston-upon-Hull and his wife Mary Feilding, a daughter of William Feilding, 3rd Earl of Denbigh, while his maternal grandparents were Elizabeth Willoughby and her husband Thomas Bayntun of Little Chalfield, Wiltshire, or else her lover John Hall of Bradford-on-Avon. He succeeded his grandfather in 1726, inheriting the Thoresby estate in Nottinghamshire.

Pierrepont studied at Eton College in 1725, and the following year went on the Grand Tour, spending ten years on the Continent and becoming known for gambling and loose living. In 1736 he returned to England with his mistress, Marie-Thérèse de Fontaine de la Touche, who became a British subject, and who remained with him until 1750. The duke had little interest in politics and did not take any part in governmental affairs.

When the Jacobite rising of 1745 broke out he raised a regiment called "Kingston's Light Horse," which distinguished itself at the Battle of Culloden. The duke attained the rank of general in the army.

He was described by Horace Walpole as "a very weak man, of the greatest beauty and finest person in England".

Pierrepont was the subject of the earliest extant reference to cricket in Nottinghamshire.  A letter dated 1751 comments that: "the Duke of Kingston at Thoresby Hall is spending all his time practising cricket because he is to play for Eton v All England in three matches".

On 8 March 1769, Pierrepont married Elizabeth Hervey at Keith's Chapel in the parish of St George's, Hanover Square, Westminster, although their marriage was later judged to have been bigamous. He died in 1773 without issue, and his titles became extinct. On the death of the bigamous Duchess in 1788, the Pierrepont estates passed to Charles Medows, who was the son of the 2nd Duke's sister, Lady Frances Medows. Charles Medows changed his name to Pierrepont in 1796 and, in 1806, he was created the first Earl Manvers.

References 

1711 births
1773 deaths
British Army generals
102
Knights of the Garter
Lord-Lieutenants of Nottinghamshire
English cricketers
People educated at Eton College
Evelyn
Freemasons of the Premier Grand Lodge of England